Megiddo is a battle honour awarded to units of the British Army, Royal Air Force and British Empire forces which successfully participated in the Battle of Megiddo in 1918 during the Palestine Campaign of the First World War.

Sharon and Nablus are subsidiary battle honours awarded for this campaign to units which participated in these actions.

See also
List of World War I battles
Battle honours of the British and Imperial Armies

Notes

References
   Battle Honours of the Indian Army 1757 - 1971.(1993) Vision Books (New Delhi) 

Battle honours of the Bombay Sappers
Battle honours of the Bengal Sappers
Battle honours of the Madras Sappers
Battle honours of the Indian Army
Battle honours of the British Army